Twin Creeks Airport  is located near Twin Creeks, Yukon, Canada and has a  wide runway that receives no maintenance.

References

Registered aerodromes in Yukon